Dubai Creek has been described as a natural saltwater creek, tidal inlet, and watercourse or waterway in Dubai, United Arab Emirates (UAE). It extends about  inwards and forms a natural port that has traditionally been used for trade and transport. Previously, it extended to Ras Al Khor Wildlife Sanctuary but as part of the new Business Bay Canal and Dubai Canal, it extends a further  to the Persian Gulf. Some sources say that the creek historically extended as far inland as Al Ain, and that the Ancient Greeks called it River Zara.

In the 1950s, extensive development of the creek began, including dredging and construction of breakwaters. A number of bridges allow movement of vehicles across the creek while abras are used as taxis. The banks and route alongside the creek houses notable government, business and residential areas. A number of tourist locations and hotels are situated along the creek.

History

Historically, the creek divided the city into two main sections – Deira and Bur Dubai. It was along the Bur Dubai creek area that members of the Bani Yas tribe first settled in the 19th century, establishing the Al Maktoum dynasty in the city. In the early 20th century, the creek, though incapable then of supporting large scale transportation, served as a minor port for dhows coming from as far away as India or East Africa. Although it impeded the entry of ships due to current flow, the creek remained an important element in establishing the commercial position of Dubai, being the only port or harbour in the city. Dubai's pearling industry, which formed the main sector of the city's economy, was based primarily on expeditions in the creek, prior to the invention of cultured pearls in the 1930s. Fishing, also an important industry at the time, was also based along the creek, whose warm and shallow waters supported a wide variety of marine life. Dhows used for purposes of fishing were also built on the foreshore of the creek.

The importance of the creek as a site of commercial activity was a justification to introduce improvements to allow larger vessels to transit, as well as to facilitate loading and unloading activities. This led, in 1955, to a plan to develop the creek, which involved dredging shallow areas, building of breakwaters, and developing its beach to become a quay suitable for loading and unloading of cargo. The creek was first dredged in 1961 to permit  draft vessels to cross through the creek at all times. The creek was dredged again in the 1960s and 1970s so that it could offer anchorage for local and coastal shipping of up to about 500 tons. The dredging opened up the creek to much more continuous traffic of merchandise, including the development of re-export, and gave Dubai an advantage over Sharjah, the other dominant trading centre in the region at the time.

Al Maktoum Bridge, the first bridge connecting Bur Dubai and Deira was constructed in 1963. Although the importance of the creek as a port has diminished with the development of the Jebel Ali Port, smaller facilities, such as Port Saeed, continue to exist along the creek, providing porting to traders from the region and the subcontinent.

2000s
In September 2007, a Dhs. 484 million (US$ 132 million) extension of the creek was finished, which now ends just south of the Metropolitan Hotel and projects on Shaikh Zayed Road. A final 2.2-kilometre extension, called the Dubai Water Canal was inaugurated 9 November 2016, crossing Shaikh Zayed Road in a northerly route, passing through Safa Park and then through Jumeirah 2. The channel is expected to continue through Jumeirah Beach Park where it will reach the shores of the Persian Gulf. The extension is part of the Dubai's Business Bay development. Additionally, a new project consisting of seven islands known as Dubai Creek Harbour was proposed to be built on Dubai Creek. The centerpiece of this project would be the Dubai Creek Tower, which is set to become the tallest building in the world. Three additional bridges are being planned for Dubai Creek, which are the Seventh Crossing, the Al Shindagha Bridge, and the Fifth Bridge.

The Dubai Festival City Mall on Dubai Creek opened in 2007. Mohammed Bin Rashid Library is being built in the Al Jaddaf area on the Creek. Dhows are constructed in this area too on the bankside. The Green Line of the Dubai Metro terminates at the Dubai Creek metro station. Close to this metro station is the Al Jaddaf Marine Station, operating ferries on the Creek, including across the Creek to the Dubai Festival City Mall.

Route

Original route 
The creek's initial inlet into mainland Dubai is along the Deira Corniche and Al Ras areas of eastern Dubai and along the Al Shindagha area of western Dubai. It then progresses south-eastward through the mainland, passing through Port Saeed and Dubai Creek Park. The creek's natural ending is at the Ras Al Khor Wildlife Sanctuary,  from its origin at the Persian Gulf. The traditional form of transport between the eastern and western sections of Dubai via the creek was through abras, which continue to operate in Dubai. In addition, the eastern and western sections are linked via four bridges (Al Maktoum Bridge, Al Garhoud Bridge, Business Bay Crossing, and Floating Bridge) and one tunnel (Al Shindagha Tunnel).

Creek extensions 
The creek has been extended by  through Business Bay, Dubai Canal and through Jumeirah into the Persian Gulf.

Landmarks

Including the most remarkable buildings alongside the Deira side of the Creek are the Deira Twin Towers, the old Dubai Creek Tower, Sheraton Dubai Creek, National Bank of Dubai, and Chamber of Commerce. On the other side of Al Maktoum Bridge along Dubai Creek is Dubai Creek Park, one of the largest parks in Dubai.

The creek is also home to the Dubai Creek Golf & Yacht Club, comprising an 18-hole tournament golf course, clubhouses, residential development and the Park Hyatt hotel.

Crossings 
Present crossings, in order from northwest to southeast
Al Shindagha Tunnel
Al Maktoum Bridge
Floating Bridge (temporary; to be replaced by the "Dubai Smile" in the future)
Al Garhoud Bridge
Business Bay Crossing

Future/planned crossings
Dubai Smile (to replace the Floating Bridge)
Sheikh Rashid bin Saeed Crossing (to link Al Jaddaf and Bur Dubai)
Al Shindagha Bridge

Ports and marinas 

 Port Saeed
 Dubai Creek Harbour
 Al Jaddaf Marine Station
 Business Bay Marina

References 

Bibliography

Further reading 

Ahmad Makia (April 2015) "Dubai Creek as an Island City-State: Free Zones, Canals, and City Doppelgängers." Avery Review:7

External links

Geography of Dubai
Ports and harbours of the United Arab Emirates
History of Dubai
Transport in Dubai
Estuaries of the United Arab Emirates